"Never Walk Alone... A Call to Arms", also known simply as "Never Walk Alone", is a song by American thrash metal band Megadeth. It was released as the second official single from their eleventh studio album, United Abominations (2007).

Background 
"Never Walk Alone... A Call to Arms" was co-written by Mustaine and guitarist Glen Drover, the only song on the album not written solely by Mustaine. When bassist James LoMenzo was asked about the lyrics of the album, he said to "talk to Dave about that". The song features Christian overtones, with it reportedly being about Jesus.

The song is one of Glen Drover's favorites on the album.

Music video 
The video for "Never Walk Alone" was filmed on August 22, 2007, at Cheyenne Studios in Castaic, California. The video was released as a DvD single. It was directed by Labworks.

The music video features the band playing on a highway with a destroyed city behind them. The shots of the band are interspersed with shots of planes and a dirigible flying through the sky.

Reception 
The song was received very positively. Metal Forces wrote that "Never Walk Alone..." was "one of the album's strongest tracks". A writer from Sputnik Music wrote that the song had some of the best lyrics on the album, while criticizing many other songs. Another writer, from Pop Matters, wrote that the song was "performed with an energy we haven’t heard since the days of the classic Mustaine/Ellefson/Friedman/Menza lineup."

Personnel  
Production and performance credits are adapted from United Abominations liner notes.
Megadeth
Dave Mustaine – guitars, lead vocals
Glen Drover – guitars, backing vocals
James LoMenzo – bass, backing vocals
Shawn Drover – drums, backing vocals
Additional musicians
Chris Rodriguez – backing vocals
Axel Mackenrott – keyboards
Production
Dave Mustaine – production
Jeff Balding – production, recording
Andy Sneap – production, mixing, mastering, recording

References 

2007 singles
Megadeth songs
Music videos directed by Wayne Isham
Songs written by Dave Mustaine
Songs about Jesus
Roadrunner Records singles